Phanaeus igneus is a species of dung beetle in the family Scarabaeidae.

Subspecies
These two subspecies belong to the species Phanaeus igneus:
 Phanaeus igneus floridanus Olsoufieff, 1924 c g
 Phanaeus igneus igneus g
Data sources: i = ITIS, c = Catalogue of Life, g = GBIF, b = Bugguide.net

References

Further reading

External links

 

igneus
Articles created by Qbugbot
Beetles described in 1819